Saint-Laurent-Blangy is a commune in the Pas-de-Calais department in the Hauts-de-France region of France.

Geography
Saint-Laurent-Blangy is a light industrial suburb and river port on the northeast side of Arras, at the junction of the N50, D42 and D919 roads.

History
Joan of Arc was imprisoned here at the chateau, after her capture at Compiègne. 
The town was completely destroyed during the First World War.

Population

Places of interest
 The church of St. Laurent, rebuilt in 1982.
 The château of Immercourt
 The feudal motte.
 The Commonwealth War Graves Commission cemeteries.

See also
Communes of the Pas-de-Calais department

References

External links

 Official website of Saint Laurent Blangy 
 Bailleul Road East CWGC cemetery
 Bailleul Road West CWGC cemetery
 The CWGC communal cemetery

Saintlaurentblangy